Artem Karpets (born March 7, 1984) is a Polish professional boxer. Karpets was born in Kremenchug, Ukraine.

Professional career 
Karpets made his professional boxing debut on 21 October 2008 in Sportpalace Dinamo, Donetsk, Ukraine.

In April 2015 he won with Mariusz Biskupski, debut Poland.

Professional record

|-
|align="center" colspan=8|21 Wins (6 knockouts), 9 Losses, 0 Draw
|-
|align=center style="border-style: none none solid solid; background: #e3e3e3"|Result
|align=center style="border-style: none none solid solid; background: #e3e3e3"|Record
|align=center style="border-style: none none solid solid; background: #e3e3e3"|Opponent
|align=center style="border-style: none none solid solid; background: #e3e3e3"|Type
|align=center style="border-style: none none solid solid; background: #e3e3e3"|Rd., Time
|align=center style="border-style: none none solid solid; background: #e3e3e3"|Date
|align=center style="border-style: none none solid solid; background: #e3e3e3"|Location
|align=center style="border-style: none none solid solid; background: #e3e3e3"|Notes
|-align=center
|Loss
|21-9
|align=left| Robert Talarek
| 
|
| 
|align=left|
|align=left|
|-align=center
|Loss
|21-8
|align=left| Araik Marutjan
| 
|
| 
|align=left|
|align=left|
|-align=center
|Loss
|21-7
|align=left| Gennady Martirosyan
| 
|
| 
|align=left|
|align=left|
|-align=center
|Loss
|21-6
|align=left| Kamil Gardzielik
| 
|
| 
|align=left|
|align=left|
|-align=center
|Loss
|21-5
|align=left| Stanyslav Skorokhod
| 
|
| 
|align=left|
|align=left|
|-align=center
|Loss
|21-4
|align=left| Maxime Beaussire
| 
|
| 
|align=left|
|align=left|
|-align=center
|Loss
|21-3
|align=left| Sasha Yengoyan
| 
|
| 
|align=left|
|align=left|
|-align=center
|Loss
|21-2
|align=left| Isaac Real
| 
|
| 
|align=left|
|align=left|
|-align=center
|Loss
|21-1
|align=left| Kamil Szeremeta
| 
|
| 
|align=left|
|align=left|
|-align=center
|Win
|21–0
|align=left| Lukasz Janik
| 
|
| 
|align=left|
|align=left|
|-align=center
|Win
|20–0
|align=left| Mariusz Biskupski
| 
|
| 
|align=left|
|align=left|
|-align=center
|Win
|19–0
|align=left| Tobia Giuseppe Loriga
| 
|
| 
|align=left|
|align=left|
|-align=center
|Win
|18–0
|align=left| Norbert Szekeres
| 
|
| 
|align=left|
|align=left|
|-align=center

References

External links

Artem Karpets at babilonpromotion.pl

1984 births
Living people
Light-middleweight boxers
Polish male boxers
People from Kremenchuk